Jaspreet Singh Manak (born 12 February 1999) is an Indian singer-songwriter. He is known predominantly for the songs "Prada", "Suit Punjaabi", "Lehanga", "Viah" and "Boss". His single "Lehanga" has featured on the UK Asian Music Chart and also the Global YouTube weekly chart.

Career 
Jass Manak started his singing career with his debut song "U-Turn" in 2017. In 2018, he released "Without You" but rose to prominence with his song "Prada" which is one of the most-streamed hit songs in India. In 2019, he released his album Age 19. In the same year he sang "Rabb Wangu" and "Bandook" for the Punjabi movie Sikander 2. His single "Lehanga" was ranked No. 22 and No. 5 on the Global and Indian YouTube music weekly charts respectively. His latest track Album is Bad Munda Manak also become one of the most-listened-to artists in Punjab on YouTube. Manak is associated with the music label Geet MP3, which was founded in 2016. He released his new single "Shopping" on 13 February 2020 and a new album, No Competition on 19 August 2020. His single "Lehanga" hit 1 billion views on YouTube in 2021. Recently, he released his 3rd Album "Bad Munda" on 19 August 2021.

As songwriter
Manak is popularly known for writing his own songs, which includes "Prada", "Lehanga", "Boss", "Viah" and every song from his debut album Age 19. He also wrote songs for singers Karan Randhawa and Nishawn Bhullar. In 2019, Manak wrote the song "Surma Kala" for Jassi Gill. He also wrote the song "Naam Jatt Da" for Gippy Grewal.

Discography

Singles

As a lyricist

Songs in films/web series

Filmography

Awards

References

External links
 

Indian singer-songwriters
Punjabi singers
Writers from Punjab, India
Living people
1999 births
Singers from Punjab, India
Punjabi-language singers